Al-Asharinah  is a Syrian village located in the Tell Salhab Subdistrict of the al-Suqaylabiyah District in Hama Governorate. According to the Syria Central Bureau of Statistics (CBS), al-Asharinah had a population of 6,347 in the 2004 census. Its inhabitants are predominantly Sunni Muslims.

References

Bibliography

 

Populated places in al-Suqaylabiyah District